The Jász (Latin: Jazones) are a Hungarian subgroup of Eastern Iranic descent who have lived in Hungary since the 13th century. They live mostly in a region known as Jászság, which comprises the north-western part of Jász-Nagykun-Szolnok county. They are sometimes known in English by the exonym Jassic and are also known by the endonyms Iasi and Jassy. They originated as a nomadic Alanic people from the Pontic steppe.

Geography

The cultural and political center of Jászság is the town of Jászberény.

Jászság is sometimes, erroneously, known as "Jazygia", after a somewhat related Sarmatian people, the Iazyges, who lived in a similar area in ancient times. However, there is no direct connection between the Jász and Iazyges.

History
The Jasz people descend from nomadic Alanic tribes who settled in the medieval Kingdom of Hungary during the 13th century following the Mongol invasions. Their language, which belonged to the east Iranian group that includes modern Ossetian, died out by the 16th century, since which time the Jasz speak Hungarian.

Their name is almost certainly related to that of the Iazyges, one of the Sarmatian tribes which, along with the Roxolani, reached the borders of Dacia during the late 1st century BC (the city of Iași is named for them). Residual elements of these tribes, ancestors of the Jasz people, remained behind in the central North Caucasus, mingling with Caucasian peoples to form the present-day Ossetes.

The Jasz people came to the Kingdom of Hungary, together with the Cumanians ( people) when their lands to the east, in some in the later Moldavia (see Iași or ) were invaded by the Mongol Empire in the mid-13th century. They were admitted by the Hungarian king, Béla IV Árpád, who hoped that the Jaszs would assist in resisting the Mongol-Tatar invasion. Shortly after their entry, the relationship worsened dramatically between the Hungarian nobility and the Cumanian-Jasz tribes, which then abandoned the country. After the end of the Mongol-Tatar invasion they returned and settled in the central part of the Pannonian Plain, near the rivers Zagyva and Tarna.

Initially, their main occupation was animal husbandry. Over the next two centuries they were assimilated into the Hungarian population; yet although their language disappeared, they preserved a distinct Jasz identity. The Hungarian rulers granted the Jasz people special privileges. Thus, the Jasz were able to be more or less self-governing in an area known as Jászság in which Jászberény developed into the regional, cultural and administrative center.

In the 16th–17th centuries, areas populated by the Jasz people were under Ottoman administration, but at the end of the 17th century they were recaptured and returned to the Kingdom of Hungary, which was then part of the Habsburg monarchy. Habsburg Emperor Leopold I sold the area to the Knights of the Teutonic Order. This saw the end of the privileged position of Jászberény. However, the Jasz people did not want to accept this situation and started to collect money with which they could buy their freedom. By 1745, they had collected half a million Rhenish gold florins, a considerable sum for those days. However, in this time the famous 'Act of Redemption' took place: the Empress Maria Theresa restored the Jasz land and Jasz hereditary privileges. From this point onwards, Jaszberény flourished. The Jasz regional autonomy was preserved until the year 1876, when the area populated by the Jasz was administratively included into the Jász-Nagykun-Szolnok County.

After dissolution of Austria-Hungary in 1918, areas populated by the Jasz people were included into an independent Hungary. Over a dozen settlements in the Great Hungarian Plain (e.g. the names Jászberény, Jászárokszállás, Jászfényszaru, Jászalsószentgyörgy) still include a link to the Jasz. In 1995, the 250th Anniversary of the Act of Redemption was celebrated in Jászberény with the President of Hungary as guest of honor as well as with numerous foreign dignitaries.

Language
Jassic is the common name in English for the original language of the Jász. It was a dialect of Ossetian, an Eastern Iranian language. Jassic became extinct and was replaced by Hungarian. The only literary record of the Jász language was found in the 1950s in the Hungarian National Széchényi Library. The language was reconstructed with the help of various Ossetian analogies.

Notable people of Jassic descent
 Sándor Csányi
 István Csukás

Related articles and peoples 
Alans
Hungarians
Székelys
Saka
Scythians
Iron people

References

External links
 Jaszbereny, Hungary. Yazd, Iran

Ethnic groups in Hungary
Iranian ethnic groups
Iranian nomads
Historical Iranian peoples
Hungarian people by ethnic or national origin
Ossetian diaspora